Jyll Bradley (born 1966, in Folkestone)  is an artist based in London. She makes installations, films, drawings and sculptures. She has produced public realm projects such as 'Green/Light (for M.R.)' (2014) commissioned by the Folkestone Triennial, and 'Dutch Light' (2017) commissioned by Turner Contemporary (Margate).

Education and early career 
Bradley studied at Goldsmiths College (University of London) (1985–88) and the Slade School of Fine Art (1991–93). During her early career, Bradley created photographic light-box installations, showing at The Showroom (London) in 1987, Riverside Studios (London) in 1988 and in British Art Show 3 at Hayward Gallery (London) in 1990. As curator Caroline Collier has written, some of Bradley's early work "appeared to be singled out for attack by some reviewers", leading the artist to withdraw from the art world for a number of years. The next public showing of her visual art work was at Spacex (Exeter) in 2003.

Career in scriptwriting and radio 
From 1998 to 2004, Bradley predominantly worked as a writer for BBC Radio, writing original radio dramas, making documentaries and dramatising novels with a focus on women's lives and stories. Her drama 'Filet de Sole Veronique' (1997) won her the European Broadcasting Award for Best Script. 'Just Plain Gardening', an all female comedy set in a fictitious girls gardening school was commissioned for two series for Woman's Hour in 2002. In 1999 Bradley was the first person to adapt American writer Kate Chopin’s banned novel ‘The Awakening’ for radio marking the centenary of its publication. During the 1990's Bradley also wrote for stage and performance, including 'The Fruit has Turned into Jam in the Fields' (1995) commissioned by Scarlett Theatre which played at The Young Vic and 'On the Playing Fields on her Rejection' (1996) at the Drill Hall. Her play Girl, watching (2003), set in 1979, is about a fourteen-year-old female birdwatcher.

Work 

Bradley's work uses the formal aesthetic and material qualities of minimalism to explore identity and place. Her work often brings together natural materials such as wood, with industrially produced materials such edge-lit plexiglass. Many of her works draw from horticultural practices and structures (such as the glass house, the hop garden, the Dutch light, the espalier) as the basis for both its form and its exploration of the relationship between people and place. Her large-scale public works have been used as sites for performance, reflecting Bradley's belief in "sculpture as a potent gathering place of people and ideas." She often works collaboratively, producing, for example, the film 'Pardes' (2020) with the Scottish Ensemble, the film 'Lean/In' (2021) with dance-artist and choreographer Michaela Cisarikova, with music by the Scottish rock band Cocteau Twins and 'Woman Holding a Balance' with fellow artist David Ward and composer Anna Clyne. In 2021 Bradley also made her autobiographical film 'M.R'. This work uses the visual frame of her Folkestone Triennial sculpture 'Green/Light (for M.R.)' as a way of exploring her story of adoption.

Reviewing a 2010 exhibition in Art Monthly, critic Gill Hedley wrote that Bradley's work "brings the very personal alongside genuinely public projects". A review of a 2011 exhibition in The Guardian, by Skye Sherwin and Robert Clark, saw her work as "a series of celebrations of Proustian memory."

Selected exhibitions

Solo exhibitions and projects 

 Threshold, Kaunas, Lithuania, European Capital of Culture, 2022 
 Pardes, Fruitmarket, Edinburgh, 2021-22 
 M.R. film, premiered at Folkestone Triennial 2021 
 Woman Holding a Balance, film, commissioned and premiered by Orchestra of St Luke's, New York 2021
 Opening the Air, Sculpture in the City, London, 2018 
 Dutch/Light Turner Contemporary, Margate, 2017–18
 Green/Light (for M.R.), The Folkestone Triennial, 2014 - present 
 The friend I have/is a passionate friend, Mummery and Schnelle, London, 2014 
 City of Trees, The National Library of Australia, for Centenary of Canberra, Australia, 2013 
 Airports for the Lights, Shadows and Particles, The Bluecoat, Liverpool, 2011
 Botanic Garden, Walker Art Gallery, Liverpool, 2009

Group exhibitions and Projects 

 Drawing Biennial, The Drawing Room, London, 2021
 Trees Die Stand, Pi Artworks, London, 2021 
 Art Cabinet, StudioK3, Zurich, Switzerland, 2020
 Carbon Copy, with Bridget Smith, HSBC Collections, Canary Wharf, 2019
 Some Islands, Coleman Projects, London, 2018
 Neo-Geometry, New Art Centre, Roche Court, 2017
 Drawing Biennial, The Drawing Room, London, 2015
 The Negligent Eye, The Bluecoat, 2014
 Green/Light (for M.R.), Folkestone Triennial, 2014
 Jyll Bradley and Stuart Brisley, Mummery+Schnelle, 2013
 point-horizon-structure, Mummery+Schnelle, 2012
 Galápagos, Calouste Gulbenkian Foundation, Lisbon, Portugal, The Fruitmarket Gallery, Edinburgh, 2012
 Human Cargo (with Melanie Jackson and Lisa Cheung), Plymouth City Museum and Art Gallery, 2007
 This Storm is What We Call Progress, Arnolfini, Bristol, 2005
 British Art Show 3, The Hayward Gallery and tour, 1990
 Interim Jeune, with Michael Landy and Serge Kliaving, Interim Art, London, 1989
 Show and Tell, Riverside Studios, London, 1988

References

External links 

 

Sculptors from London
1966 births
Living people
Alumni of Goldsmiths, University of London
Alumni of the Slade School of Fine Art